Slobodan Unković (born 19 December 1938) is a Serbian politician and diplomat. He served as the rector of the University of Belgrade from 1987 to 1991, speaker of the National Assembly of Serbia during 1991, and Minister of Science from 1993 to 1996.

Education and career
He finished secondary education in Dubrovnik. In 1961 he graduated from the University of Belgrade Faculty of Economics, where he finished Magistrate studies in 1964 and Doctoral studies in 1966. His further studies included specialization at Stanford University in the USA, as well as universities in the UK, Italy and other countries.

Unković was awarded a number of awards and decorations from Serbia and abroad.

He is an emeritus professor at Lomonosov University in Moscow and Renmin University in Beijing, as well as honorable holder of doctoral degree at Lincoln University in USA and Mediterranean University in Montenegro.

References

External links
 Zadužbinar, University of Belgrade 2015. (Serbian)

20th-century Serbian people
Presidents of the National Assembly (Serbia)
University of Belgrade Faculty of Economics alumni
People from Trebinje
Serbs of Bosnia and Herzegovina
1938 births
Living people